The women's 20 kilometres race walk at the 2014 European Athletics Championships took place at the Letzigrund on 14 August.

Records

Medalists

Schedule

Results

References

Final Results

Race Walk 20 W
Racewalking at the European Athletics Championships
2014 in women's athletics